Mohammed Isa Al Abbasi is a Bahraini politician and journalist. He was sworn into the Council of Representatives on December 12, 2018.

Education
Al Abassi graduated from Ahlia University.

2011 protests
During the Bahraini uprising of 2011, as a broadcaster on the TV channel of the Bahrain Radio and Television Corporation, Al Abassi took a firmly royalist stance which led to heavy opposition criticism. In 2013, he was suspended in a climate of increased rapprochement between the opposition and the House of Khalifa.

House of Representatives
Al Abassi entered politics by running in the 2018 Bahraini general election for the third constituency of the Muharraq Governorate in the national House of Representatives. He won 2,217 votes for 38.54% in the first round on November 24, necessitating a second round on December 1, in which he defeated Mohammed Al Alawi with 3,096 votes for 58.64%.

References

Members of the Council of Representatives (Bahrain)
People of the Bahraini uprising of 2011
Bahraini journalists
Bahraini politicians 
Bahraini Sunni Muslims
Bahraini people of Iranian descent
Living people
Year of birth missing (living people)